Jalagam Kondala Rao was an Indian politician. He was elected to the Lok Sabha, the lower house of the Parliament of India from Khammam as a member of the Indian National Congress.

References

External links
Official biographical sketch on the Parliament of India website

1928 births
2018 deaths
Indian National Congress politicians
Lok Sabha members from Andhra Pradesh
India MPs 1977–1979
India MPs 1980–1984